Sir Richard Everard, 2nd Baronet (1624 – 29 August 1694) was an English  politician who sat in the House of Commons from 1661 to 1679.

Everard was the son of Sir Richard Everard, 1st Baronet of Much Waltham, Essex and his first wife  Joan Barrington, daughter of Sir Francis Barrington, 1st Baronet and his wife Joan Cromwell, daughter of Sir Henry Cromwell. In 1661, he was elected Member of Parliament for Westminster in the Cavalier Parliament. He succeeded to the Baronetcy about 1680.
Everard died at the age of 69, and was buried at Waltham.

Everard married  firstly, in or before 1647, Elizabeth Gibb, daughter of Sir Henry Gibb, Baronet and his wife Anne Gibbs, daughter of Sir Ralph Gibbs, of Honiton,  Warwickshire. He married secondly, Jane Finet, daughter of Sir John Finet, Master of the Ceremonies.

References

1625 births
1694 deaths
English MPs 1661–1679
Baronets in the Baronetage of England